Route 168 is a highway in northeastern Missouri.  Its eastern terminus is at U.S. Route 61 in Hannibal; its western terminus is at Route 15 in Shelbyville.

Route description

History

Major intersections

References

168
168
Transportation in Shelby County, Missouri
Transportation in Marion County, Missouri